James Horton (born 1850) was a sailor serving in the United States Navy who received the Medal of Honor for bravery.

Biography
On February 13, 1879, he risked his life along with two other sailors to repair the ship's rudder during a storm. Horton was lowered over the stern of the ship and cut the fastenings of the ship's rudder chains, allowing the rudder itself to be repaired. For his actions he received the Medal of Honor March 20, 1905.

Medal of Honor citation
Rank and organization: Captain of the Top, U.S. Navy. Born: 1850, Boston, Mass. Accredited to: Massachusetts. G.O. No.: 326, 18 October 1884.

Citation:

Serving on board the U.S.S. Constitution, at sea, 13 February 1879, Horton showed courageous conduct in going over the stern during a heavy gale and cutting the fastenings of the ship's rudder chains.

See also

List of Medal of Honor recipients during peacetime

References

External links

1850 births
Year of death missing
United States Navy Medal of Honor recipients
United States Navy sailors
People from Boston
Non-combat recipients of the Medal of Honor